Hoshaya is a national-religious community settlement in northern Israel. Located to the south-east of Shefa-'Amr, on Route 77 between Hamovil Interchange and the Golani Interchange, three kilometers from the Beit Rimon Interchange, it falls under the jurisdiction of Jezreel Valley Regional Council.

Etymology
The village is named after Rabbi Hoshaya (or Oshaya), a scholar in the Amoraic Period of the Talmud who lived in nearby Sepphoris.

History
Hoshaya was founded on the land of the depopulated Palestinian town of Saffuriya in 1981. It was established as a Nahal settlement, originally planned for soldiers from moshavim in the Galilee, and later manned by soldier of the religious Nahal Youth Aliyah, as part of the "Lookouts in the Galilee" plan. Three years later, it was re-purposed for a civilian population, and ten families moved into caravans on the site, with some of the original Nahal soldiers remaining.

The Hoshaya community lives according to Orthodox Judaism, with the addition of are many religious activities for women: Torah reading by women for women, reading of the Scroll of Esther on Purim by women for women, reading of the Book of Ruth on Shavuot.

The founders of the village stressed volunteering and community activity. In 2000, they founded a soup kitchen to prepare and deliver meals for the needy in nearby communities.

All the streets in Hoshaya are named after the former Israeli settlements in Gush Katif: Gan Or, Morag, Shirat Hayam, Pe'at Sadeh, Dugit, Katif, Bedolah, Gadid, Ganei Tal, Elei Sinai.

Currently, there are facilities such as Nativ Elementary School (including pupils from Tefahot, Kalanit, and Kfar Hananya), Kfar Kedem, an ancient Galilee village theme park, and a boutique hotel. Maccabi and Clalit medical clinics are active in Hoshaya.

Notable residents
Elazar Stern

References

External links
Village website 

Community settlements
Nahal settlements
Religious Israeli communities
Populated places established in 1980
Populated places in Northern District (Israel)
1980 establishments in Israel